Margaret Lake Airport  is located adjacent to Margaret Lake, Alberta, Canada.

References

Registered aerodromes in Alberta
Mackenzie County